Oğuzhan Tüzün (born October 20, 1982 in Istanbul, Turkey) is a Turkish sport shooter competing in the trap event.

Tüzün started sport shooting with his father's encouragement in 1996 at the age of 15. His father Özer Tüzün, a dentist, is a passionate hunter and shooter, who personally coaches his son. Oğuzhan Tüzün works as a teacher following his graduation from the Sports Academy in physical education and sports.

He became already Turkish champion in the cadets category in 1997. At the age of 18, he participated at the 2000 Summer Olympics in Sydney, Australia placing 30th.

He won the silver medal in the junior category at the 2002 ISSF World Shooting Championships in Lahti, Finland. Tüzün represented Turkey at the 2004 Summer Olympics without advancing to the final. He placed 4th at the 2005 Mediterranean Games in Almeria, Spain. In 2009, he won the bronze medal at the World Shotgun Championships held in Maribor, Slovenia.

Tüzün became gold medalist at the 2010 ISSF World Cup Final held in Izmir, Turkey and repeated his success at the 2011 ISSF World Cup in Concepción, Chile. This result brought him the qualification to the 2012 Summer Olympics, where he finished in 24th.

Achievements

References

1982 births
Sportspeople from Istanbul
Turkish male sport shooters
Trap and double trap shooters
Living people
Olympic shooters of Turkey
Shooters at the 2000 Summer Olympics
Shooters at the 2004 Summer Olympics
Shooters at the 2012 Summer Olympics
European Games competitors for Turkey
Shooters at the 2015 European Games
Competitors at the 2018 Mediterranean Games
Mediterranean Games competitors for Turkey
Mediterranean Games gold medalists for Turkey
Competitors at the 2022 Mediterranean Games
20th-century Turkish people
21st-century Turkish people